Anicius Olybrius (died 2 November 472) was Roman emperor from July 472 until his death later that same year; his rule as Augustus in the western Roman Empire was not recognised as legitimate by the ruling Augustus in the eastern Roman Empire, Leo I. He was in reality a puppet ruler raised to power by Ricimer, the magister militum of Germanic descent, and was mainly interested in religion, while the actual power was held by Ricimer and his nephew Gundobad.

Biography

Family and early career
Olybrius was born in Rome, in the ancient and powerful gens Anicia, of Italian descent.

According to the consensus of historians, he was related to the consul Anicius Hermogenianus Olybrius, whose wife and cousin, Anicia Juliana, had the same name that Olybrius gave to his own daughter. Other historians consider this questionable, as "Juliana" was a common name in the gens Anicia, and because Hermogenianus seems to have begotten only one daughter, who took chastity vows. Other possible fathers have therefore been proposed: either Flavius Anicius Probus (suggested by Settipani) or, according to some clues, Petronius Maximus.

Olybrius married Placidia, younger daughter of western augustus Valentinian III and his wife Licinia Eudoxia, thus creating a bond between a member of the senatorial aristocracy and the conjoined Valentinianic–Theodosian dynasties. The year of their wedding is not recorded, although the historian Priscus implies it took place before the Vandals under Gaiseric's sack of Rome (June 2–16, 455). Oost has pointed out that in his chronicle Hydatius wrote Placidia was unmarried as of 455.

Steven Muhlberger points out that many of the events in the chronicle of Hydatius are based on hearsay, that problems with his chronology "resulted from delays and distortions in the best information to which he had access," and thus the evidence from Hydatius is not as decisive as Oost believed. Regardless, the powerful magister militum Aetius had forced Valentinian to betroth Placidia to his own son Gaudentius, so Olybrius could not have married her before Aetius' death.

Aetius' death came 21 September 454, when the Emperor Valentinian provoked a quarrel with him that ended with the Emperor killing Aetius with his own sword. The following year, Valentinian was killed by some soldiers who had served under Aetius, probably instigated by the patricius Petronius Maximus, who succeeded to the throne. Petronius, who was a high-ranking imperial officer and a member of a family belonging to the senatorial aristocracy, married the augusta Licinia Eudoxia, widow of Valentinian. He also elevated his own son Palladius to the rank of caesar and had him marry Eudocia, elder daughter of Valentinian.

According to those historians who believe that Olybrius was Petronius' son, it was in 455 that Olybrius married Placidia, between 17 April, when Petronius was acclaimed augustus, and 31 May, when he died; this would explain the marriage between Olybrius and Valentinian's younger daughter as a move to secure Petronius' legitimacy as emperor.

Another possibility is that Olybrius and Placidia were engaged in 455, and only after Gaiseric freed her from his possession in the early 460s were they at last married. Oost mentions this possibility in his book Galla Placidia Augusta. The surviving evidence is not sufficient to allow us to decide between these alternatives.

Twice candidate for the throne
The Vandals, led by King Gaiseric, took advantage of the confusion and weakness of the Western Empire in the wake of Valentinian's turbulent succession, moving into Italy and sacking Rome in June 455. Before returning to Africa, the Vandals took Licinia Eudoxia and her two daughters as hostages. According to the 6th-century historian John Malalas, Olybrius was in Constantinople at the time. On the other hand, the 6th-century chronicler Evagrius Scholasticus writes that Olybrius had fled Rome on the approach of Gaiseric's army.

During his residence in the Eastern capital, Olybrius expressed his interest in religious matters. He met Daniel the Stylite, who, according to Christian tradition, prophesied the liberation of Licinia Eudoxia. In the meantime, the Western Empire went through a rapid succession of Emperors. After Petronius, the Gallic-Roman senator Avitus was proclaimed Emperor by the Visigoth king Theodoric II and ruled for two years; he was deposed by Majorian, who ruled for four years before being killed by his general Ricimer in 461.

Gaiseric supported Olybrius to assume the vacant Western throne because Gaiseric's son Huneric and Olybrius had married the two daughters of Valentinian III, and with Olybrius on the throne, Gaiseric could exert great influence on the Western Empire. Therefore, Gaiseric freed Licinia Eudoxia (fulfilling Daniel's prophesy) and her daughter Placidia (Olybrius' wife), but he did not cease his raids on Italy's coasts. His project failed, however, as Ricimer, who had become the Magister militum of the West, chose Libius Severus as new Emperor (461–465). Placidia was now free, however, joining her husband at Constantinople, where she bore him a daughter, Anicia Juliana, in 462.

Olybrius was nearly chosen for the Western throne again in 465, after Libius Severus died. Gaiseric was again his major supporter, but the Eastern Emperor Leo I chose the noble Procopius Anthemius. Olybrius' association with Gaiseric did not harm his career, however, as the Eastern court chose him for the high honour of the consulate in 464.

Rise to the throne
Sources agree that Olybrius rose to the western throne thanks to the western magister militum Ricimer. They differ over the timing and order of the events leading to his ascent.

In the version provided by John Malalas, and championed by J. B. Bury, Olybrius was sent to Italy in 472 by Leo I, ostensibly to mediate between Ricimer and Anthemius, who was besieged by Ricimer in Rome. Once he had accomplished this, Olybrius would then continue to Carthage and offer a peace treaty to Gaiseric. Leo suspected that Olybrius favored the Vandal king, however, and would secretly take his side and betray the suspicious Emperor. Leo had Olybrius followed by another envoy bearing a letter for Anthemius stating:
 I have removed Aspar and Ardaburius from this world, so that no one who might oppose me would survive. But you also must kill your son-in-law Ricimer, lest there be anyone who might betray you. Moreover, I also have sent the patrician Olybrius to you; I wish you to kill him, so that you might reign, ruling rather than serving others.

Ricimer had placed a guard at Ostia who found the secret letter. Ricimer showed the document to Olybrius, which convinced Olybrius to accept the purple. From Ricimer's point of view, Olybrius was a good candidate, as a member of the Roman senatorial aristocracy and because of his marriage to Placidia; his marriage to her makes him the last emperor of the conjoined Valentinianic–Theodosian dynasties to rule in the west. Ricimer had Anthemius killed and Olybrius acclaimed Emperor (11 July 472).

The competing version of events does not mention the secret letter. Instead, after arriving in Rome, Olybrius was proclaimed emperor several months before Anthemius' death, in April or May 472. Ricimer then besieged the part of Rome where Anthemius was for several months until the lawful Emperor was abandoned by his partisans, captured in a church, and put to death by Gundobad, Ricimer's nephew. This version implies that Olybrius was secretly supported by the Emperor Leo, which explains why Leo sent him there. Three of our sources – Theophanes, the Paschal Chronicle, and Paullus Diaconus – support this version. Edward Gibbon accepts this implication as fact, although none of the three sources explicitly state that Leo supported Olybrius. What other reason could there be, Bury asks, then answers his own rhetorical question: "the facts that Anthemius was Leo's chosen candidate, his filius, and that Olybrius was the friend of his foe Genseric, are a strong counter-argument."

Reign and death
The reign of Olybrius was short and uneventful. Soon after the death of Anthemius, Ricimer also died, on 9 or 19 August; his nephew Gundobad was elevated to magister militum in his place. Very little is known of Olybrius' policy; in his Vita Epifanius, Ennodius describes him as a pious man who acted accordingly. As evidence, he had minted a new series of gold coins bearing a cross and the new legend SALVS MVNDI ("Welfare of the World") instead of the usual SALVS REIPVBLICAE ("Welfare of the State"). It is also noteworthy that Olybrius is depicted on his coins without helm and spear, common symbols on his predecessors' coinage, suggesting he had little interest in military matters.

Olybrius had a palace in the Tenth region of Constantinople at one end of the Mese, the main street, along the Constantinianae. Olybrius also restored, at his own expense, the nearby church of Saint Euphemia in Chalcedon, a famous church that had been chosen by the augusta Pulcheria, sister of Theodosius II, for the Council of Chalcedon in 451. This choice was a sign of the bond between Olybrius, a Roman senator, with the imperial Theodosian dynasty.

Olybrius died of dropsy after only seven months of rule, most likely on 2 November.

Olybrius in culture
In 1707, Apostolo Zeno and Pietro Pariati wrote a libretto entitled Flavio Anicio Olibrio. The story told in the opera is quite different from the real one, despite the fact that Zeno claimed to use several historical sources (Evagrius Scholasticus l.2.c.7, Procopius of Caesarea, Historia Vandalorum, l.1, Paul the Deacon, vi): Ricimer captures Rome, frees his sister Teodolinda and enslaves Placidia, daughter of Valentinian III; a little later, Olybrius frees Rome and Placidia, and marries her.

The libretto was written for a dramma per musica in three acts by Francesco Gasparini, performed that same year in the Teatro San Cassiano in Venice, but the same libretto was put to music also by Nicola Porpora (1711, in Naples, as Il trionfo di Flavio Anicio Olibrio),

References

Notes

External links
 Mathisen, Ralph W., "Anicius Olybrius", De Imperatoribus Romanis

Further reading
F.M. Clover, "The Family and Early Career of Anicius Olybrius", Historia, 27 (1978), pp. 169–96.

472 deaths
5th-century Roman emperors
5th-century Roman consuls
Anicii
Deaths from edema
Imperial Roman consuls
Theodosian dynasty
Year of birth unknown